Axel Phillip Kaiser Barents-Von Hohenhagen (born 4 July 1981) is a Chilean writer, lawyer and political scientist.

A Mont Pelerin Society member, he has collaborated as a columnist for El Mercurio, El Líbero and Diario Financiero. In 2013 and 2014 he published two articles in Forbes: "Is this the end of the Chilean economic miracle?" and "Michelle Bachelet is destroying Chile's free market institutions". Some critics argued about the latter that Kaiser was overstating the impact of Michelle Bachelet's reforms.

Kaiser works for Fundación Para El Progreso, a think tank founded by the businessman Nicolás Ibáñez Scott. The think tank's mission, as stated on its website, is "to promote a cultural change which would advance groundwork for a more prosper, free, humane, inclusive and peaceful society, through the promotion of liberal idean in fields of influence and the formation of young leaders who can guide Chile and Latin America through the road to progress".

An opinion poll, conducted by La Segunda in 2017, ranked Kaiser in seventh place among the most admired public intellectuals nationwide. El Mercurio has described him as Chilean liberalism' main exponent. He is also the first Latin American to obtain first place in Mont Pelerin Society's Hayek Essay Contest.

He has written works such as: The Fatal Ignorance: The right-wing's Cultural Anorexia Against the Ideological Advance of Progressive Ideas, The Tyranny of Equality, where he attempts to dismantle what he considers the fallacies of egalitarianism, and  The Populist Deception, where he, alongside Guatemalan political scientist Gloria Álvarez criticizes the left-wing populism phenomena.

Biography
Kaiser was born into a third-generation German-Chilean family, who emigrated to Chile in April 1939. He is the son of Hans Christian Kaiser Wagner and Rosmarie Barents Haensgen, and brother of Vanessa Kaiser, scholar at the Universidad Autónoma de Chile and director of the libertarian think tank Centro de Estudios Libertarios, and Johannes Kaiser, a right-wing YouTuber and current member of the Chamber of Deputies of Chile.

While living in the Chilean capital, he completed a law degree at Universidad Diego Portales. He then travelled to Germany to pursue two master's degrees (one in Law and one in American Studies) and a PhD in American Studies in Heidelberg University, with the thesis The American Philosophical Foundations of the Chilean Free Market Revolution. Back in Chile, he was a full professor at Universidad del Desarrollo and the Universidad de los Andes, where he taught a course on Latin American Politics.

Criticism
Writing in El Desconcierto in 2018 pundit Rodrigo Karmy Bolton posits that Fernando Atria is Kaiser's main "intellectual enemy". Karmy Bolton criticizes Kaiser's for misportraying the left as "violent, statist and populist" and equating state intervention with violence. For Karmy Bolton Kaiser's view is that "either we accept neoliberalism or [we] are stupid" and portrays Kaiser as a "worshipper of the market".

According to another pundit, Rodrigo Rettig, Kaiser has violated the principal premise of the social sciences —"from the particular case you can't obtain general premises"— when referring to political violence experienced by his brother in 2018. Kaiser wrote in reference to it that in Chile "grave injuries have, in practice, no punishment" while omitting the 2,500,000 CLP fine that was given to each of the two aggressors, and then stated that "in Chile, deliquency has been normalized".

Kaiser has further been questioned by actress Susana Hidalgo for copyright infringement by using one of her images of the 2019–2020 Chilean protests in the promotional posters of his talks in Mexico in February 2020.

Kaiser's and Gloria Álvarez's book El engaño del populismo has been lambasted by Alfredo Joignant in a 2016 televised debate with Kaiser. Joignant called the book "confuse", "harmful" and "very bad". More specifically, Joignant criticizes it for having use of the "category of populism" that is "out of control" and that it mischaracterizes populism as a political project in its own right. Joignant concludes the book "does not withstand an undergraduate academic jury". Kaiser answered to Joignant's criticism by asking if he had actually read the book with Joignant replying "I read it in diagonal" because "the argument is too simplistic".

Books
 El Chile que Viene (2007)
 La Fatal Ignorancia (2009)
 La Miseria del Intervencionismo (2012)
 La Tiranía de la Igualdad (2015)
 El Engaño Populista junto con Gloria Álvarez (2016)
 El Papa y el Capitalismo (2018)
 La Neoinquisición (2020)
 El Economista Callejero (2021)

See also
 Fundación para el Progreso
 El Líbero

References

1981 births
Chilean non-fiction writers
Chilean libertarians
Chilean anti-communists
Diego Portales University alumni
Heidelberg University alumni
Living people
Academic staff of the University for Development
Chilean people of German descent
Chilean columnists